Khachatur Kesaratsi (1590–1646) was an archbishop in the Safavid Empire of Armenian ethnicity. He is credited with the founding of the first printing press in Iran, in 1633, or 1636. In 1638, the first book was printed; a Saghmosaran (Psalter).

References

Sources
 
 
 

1590 births
1646 deaths
Persian Armenians
17th-century people of Safavid Iran
Bishops of the Armenian Apostolic Church
Iranian Christians
Armenian Apostolic Church in Iran
Armenian printers
17th-century Oriental Orthodox archbishops